Saint-Venant-de-Paquette is a municipality in Quebec, Canada. The village, founded in 1862, is situated north of East-Hereford, south of St. Malo, and east of Coaticook.

Demographics

Population
Population trend:

There are about 70 residents; however, the exact number is not available. The municipality is unable to provide an exact figure because many of the homes are used as cottages or as second homes.

Les Amis du Patrimoine 
Since 1993, a committee called Les Amis du Patrimoine was organized in order to promote and organize cultural and artistic activities in the village. Some of these activities have funded, in part, the maintenance and renovation of the church. Further, Les Amis du Patrimoine have added, to their list of responsibilities, the opening of a small boutique called the "Tree House", and, have created a nature-path called the "Poetic Trail". Les Amis du Patrimoine in Saint-Venant-de-Paquette is a non-profit organization that depends mainly on the voluntary involvement of its citizens and from elsewhere.

References

External links

Municipalities in Quebec
Incorporated places in Estrie
Coaticook Regional County Municipality